Ryttmästare (from the German word Rittmeister) was a military rank in the Swedish cavalry in the Swedish Army. The rank corresponded to the rank of captain in other service branches. The rank was abolished in 1972.

History
The military rank of ryttmästare as a designation for the rank of captain had been used since the 16th century. The name was then used for the commander of a company of riders (several of them were usually part of a squadron).  later became squadron commander. Since the 17th century it was the title for a company officer of the highest rank in the Swedish cavalry with position between lieutenant and major (corresponding to the rank of captain in other branches). The rank was abolished after a reform in 1972.

Uniform

Field uniform model 1958/1959 – rank structure of 1949

Uniform model 1939 – rank structure of 1949

Uniform model 1939

Uniform model 1923

Uniform model 1910

Uniform model 1906

Other

References

Military ranks of the Swedish Army

sv:Ryttmästare